Pedro Manuel Colón de Portugal y de la Cueva, 7th Duke of Veragua, (25 December 1651 – 9 September 1710) was a Spanish noble.

He was a Knight of the Order of the Golden Fleece since 1675, Viceroy of Valencia, 1679–1680, Viceroy of Sicily, 1696–1701, and Viceroy of Sardinia, 1706–1708.

He was born in Madrid, the eldest son of Pedro Nuño Colón de Portugal, 6th Duke of Veragua and his first wife, Isabel Fernández de la Cueva y Enríquez de Cabrera, daughter of  Francisco Fernández de la Cueva, 7th Duke of Alburquerque.

Pedro Manuel married Teresa Marina de Ayala, 4th Marchioness de la Mota, in Madrid on 30 August 1674.

Their eldest son was Pedro Manuel Nuño Colón de Portugal y Ayala. After his death in 1733, his sister Catalina Ventura, deceased 1739,  became 9th Duchess of Veragua; but because she had married on 31 December 1716 Madrid James Francis FitzJames Stuart y Burgh, their children inherited Spanish and a few British titles.

Further reading
Pedro Manuel Colon de Portugal y de la Cueva, 7. conde de Gelves, Geneall.net (in Spanish)
Del Pasado - Por el Conde San Juan de Jaruco, the Cuban Genealogy Club of Miami (in Spanish, archived link)
La Sede como Escenario de las Actividades de la Fundación. El Hospital de los Venerables, Fundación Focus (in Spanish, archived link)
BLOG  VIAJE A LA CIUDAD DE SEVILLA (in Spanish)

1651 births
1710 deaths
107
Pedro Manuel
Viceroys of Valencia
Viceroys of Sicily
Viceroys of Sardinia
Knights of the Golden Fleece